Lost Springs is a city in Marion County, Kansas, United States.  It was named for the old lost spring near the city.  As of the 2020 census, the population of the city was 55.  It is located south of Herington, about 0.6 miles west of the intersection of U.S. Route 77 (aka U.S. Route 56) highway and 340th Street next to the Union Pacific Railroad.

History

Early history

For many millennia, the Great Plains of North America was inhabited by nomadic Native Americans.  From the 16th century to 18th century, the Kingdom of France claimed ownership of large parts of North America.  In 1762, after the French and Indian War, France secretly ceded New France to Spain, per the Treaty of Fontainebleau.

19th century

In 1802, Spain returned most of the land to France.  In 1803, most of the land for modern day Kansas was acquired by the United States from France as part of the 828,000 square mile Louisiana Purchase for 2.83 cents per acre.

From the 1820s to the 1870s, one of the most significant land routes in the United States was the Santa Fe Trail. The "Lost Spring" was one of the favorite camping spots on the Santa Fe Trail because it generally had an ample supply of good water. It was located 15 miles west of Diamond Spring, which was a day's travel for a wagon train. The spring apparently got its name because it is a periodic spring, drying up at times for a week, a month, or even two years, so those visiting the site sometimes could not locate the spring on a return trip. A stage station was set up nearby in 1859 and was known as the Lost Springs Station, but no visible evidence remains of the station.  The trail was active across Marion County from 1821 to 1866.

In 1854, the Kansas Territory was organized, then in 1861 Kansas became the 34th U.S. state.  In 1855, Marion County was established within the Kansas Territory, which included the land for modern day Lost Springs.

A post office existed in Lost Spring from August 29, 1861, to May 23, 1864.  Later, the post office was reestablished as Lost Springs on July 9, 1879.

In 1887, the Chicago, Kansas and Nebraska Railway built a branch line north–south from Herington through Lost Springs to Caldwell.  It foreclosed in 1891 and was taken over by Chicago, Rock Island and Pacific Railway, which shut down in 1980 and reorganized as Oklahoma, Kansas and Texas Railroad, merged in 1988 with Missouri Pacific Railroad, and finally merged in 1997 with Union Pacific Railroad.  Most locals still refer to this railroad as the "Rock Island".

In 1887, Atchison, Topeka and Santa Fe Railway built a branch line from Neva (3 miles west of Strong City) to Superior, Nebraska.  This branch line connects Strong City, Neva, Rockland, Diamond Springs, Burdick, Lost Springs, Jacobs, Hope, Navarre, Enterprise, Abilene, Talmage, Manchester, Longford, Oak Hill, Miltonvale, Aurora, Huscher, Concordia, Kackley, Courtland, Webber, Superior.  In 1996, the Atchison, Topeka and Santa Fe Railway merged with Burlington Northern Railroad and renamed to the current BNSF Railway.  Most locals still refer to this railroad as the "Santa Fe".

At some point, the "Santa Fe" line from Neva to Lost Springs was pulled but the right of way has not been abandoned.  This branch line was originally called "Strong City and Superior line" but later the name was shortened to the "Strong City line".  The two railways are connected via a switch to allow north-bound "Rock Island" traffic to connect onto the north-west-bound "Santa Fe" tracks.  This is the only way for the Santa Fe traffic to travel north-west after removing the tracks to Neva.

20th century
The National Old Trails Road, also known as the Ocean-to-Ocean Highway, was established in 1912, and was routed through Lehigh, Hillsboro, Marion, Lost Springs.

Geography
Lost Springs is located at coordinates 38.5661225, -96.9664045 in the scenic Flint Hills and Great Plains of the state of Kansas. The county line is 1.7 miles east of Lost Springs.

Climate
The climate in this area is characterized by hot, humid summers and generally mild to cool winters.  According to the Köppen Climate Classification system, Lost Springs has a humid subtropical climate, abbreviated "Cfa" on climate maps.

Area events
 Cinco de Mayo.

Area attractions
Lost Springs has one listing on the National Register of Historic Places (NRHP).
 Santa Fe Trail
 Lost Spring (NRHP), 2.5 mi west of Lost Springs on 340th Street. From the 1820s to the 1870s, one of the most significant land routes in the United States was the Santa Fe Trail, and ran south of the spring. Lost Spring was one of the favorite camping spots on the Santa Fe Trail because it generally had an ample supply of good water.
 Santa Fe Trail Markers, numerous markers in the area.
 Santa Fe Trail Self-Guided Auto Tour.

Demographics

2010 census
As of the census of 2010, there were 70 people, 26 households, and 23 families residing in the city. The racial makeup of the city was 82.9% White, 1.4% Native American, 7.1% from other races, and 8.6% from two or more races. Hispanic or Latino of any race were 14.3% of the population.

There were 26 households, of which 26.9% had children under the age of 18 living with them, 61.5% were married couples living together, 11.5% had a female householder with no husband present, 15.4% had a male householder with no wife present, and 11.5% were non-families. 11.5% of all households were made up of individuals. The average household size was 2.69 and the average family size was 2.70.

The median age in the city was 45.5 years. 18.6% of residents were under the age of 18; 11.4% were between the ages of 18 and 24; 20% were from 25 to 44; 27.2% were from 45 to 64; and 22.9% were 65 years of age or older. The gender makeup of the city was 55.7% male and 44.3% female.

2000 census
As of the census of 2000, there were 71 people, 30 households, and 23 families residing in the city. The racial makeup of the city was 92.96% White, 1.41% Native American, 2.82% from other races, and 2.82% from two or more races. Hispanic or Latino of any race were 7.04% of the population.

There were 30 households, out of which 36.7% had children under the age of 18 living with them, 56.7% were married couples living together, 16.7% had a female householder with no husband present, and 23.3% were non-families. 23.3% of all households were made up of individuals, and 13.3% had someone living alone who was 65 years of age or older. The average household size was 2.37 and the average family size was 2.70.

In the city, the population was spread out, with 28.2% under the age of 18, 5.6% from 18 to 24, 25.4% from 25 to 44, 28.2% from 45 to 64, and 12.7% who were 65 years of age or older. The median age was 39 years. For every 100 females, there were 91.9 males. For every 100 females age 18 and over, there were 82.1 males.

As of 2000 the median income for a household in the city was $15,455, and the median income for a family was $16,250. Males had a median income of $15,625 versus $11,250 for females. The per capita income for the city was $7,227. There were 15.8% of families and 21.7% of the population living below the poverty line, including 29.4% of under eighteens and none of those over 64.

Government
The Lost Springs government consists of a mayor and five council members.  The council meets the 2nd Wednesday of each month at 7PM.
 City Hall.
 Fire Department.
 U.S. Post Office, 125 Berry St.

Education
The community is served by Centre USD 397 public school district.  The high school is a member of T.E.E.N., a shared video teaching network between five area high schools.
 Centre School; 2374 310th St, Lost Springs, KS; between Lost Springs and Lincolnville, east of U.S. 77 highway.

Sports
The Centre High School mascot is a Cougar. All high school athletic and non-athletic competition is overseen by the Kansas State High School Activities Association. For 2010/2011 seasons, the football team competes as Class 8 Man - Division II.

Media

Print
 Marion County Record, county newspaper for Marion County.
 Hillsboro Free Press, free newspaper for greater Marion County area.
 The Herington Times, newspaper from Herington.

Infrastructure

Transportation
Highway U.S. Route 77 is 0.8 mi east of Lost Springs. Lost Springs is served by the Union Pacific Railroad, formerly the Oklahoma, Kansas and Texas Railroad, and prior, the Chicago, Rock Island and Pacific Railroad. Lost Springs is located on UP's Texas main line to Fort Worth, Texas. A rail siding is located there for meets with passing trains, before entering UP's Herington, Kansas yard.  The Burlington Northern Santa Fe Railway, formerly the Atchison, Topeka and Santa Fe Railway, also has a line that enters the area, and connects with the UP at the Northeast corner of town.  At one time this line crossed over the UP at a diamond crossing, and continued east towards Burdick, Kansas, but it has since been removed.

Utilities
 Internet
 Fiber Optics is provided by TCT.
 Satellite is provided by HughesNet, StarBand, WildBlue.
 TV
 Fiber Optics is provided by TCT.
 Satellite is provided by DirecTV, Dish Network.
 Terrestrial is provided by regional digital TV stations.
 Telephone
 Fiber Optics is provided by TCT.
 Electricity 
 Rural is provided by Flint Hills RECA.

Notable people

 Lloyd Metzler, (1913–1980), American economist.
 William R. Novak, (1929–2012), Kansas House of Representatives, Farmer, Stockman, Wholesale Aircraft Parts.  Appointed February 29, 1972, to replace Lawrence D. Slocombe (Peabody) who died while in office.

See also
 Centre High School
 National Register of Historic Places listings in Marion County, Kansas
 Historical Maps of Marion County, Kansas
 Santa Fe Trail
 National Old Trails Road

References

Further reading

 Early Settlement of Lost Springs; Marion Review; September 15, 1937.

External links

City
 Lost Springs - Directory of Public Officials, League of Kansas Municipalities
Historical
 Historic Images of Lost Springs, Special Photo Collections at Wichita State University Library.
 Marion County cemetery list, archive of KsGenWeb
 Marion County history bibliography,  Marion County school bibliography, Kansas Historical Society
 Lost Springs - Santa Fe Trail Research site
Maps
 Lost Springs city map, KDOT
 Topo Map of Lost Springs / Lincolnville / Tampa / Burdick / Herington area, USGS
 Santa Fe Trail map, NPS

Cities in Kansas
Cities in Marion County, Kansas
Populated places established in 1859
1859 establishments in Kansas Territory